On is the debut studio album by Puerto Rican singer-songwriter Jean. It was released on May 16, 2006.

Track listing
 "Duele"
 "Juegas Con Fuego" (featuring Black Violin)
 "No Te Puedo Alcanzar"
 "Vamo' A Chocar" (featuring Black Violin)
 "Get There"
 "Spanish Holiday" (featuring Epidemic)
 "Girls" (featuring Black Violin)
 "Dulce Café"
 "Cruel" (featuring M.R.P.)
 "Ves"
 "Get There (Acoustic Version)"

References

2006 debut albums